KPLD (105.1 FM) is a radio station broadcasting a hot adult contemporary format. Licensed to Kanab, Utah, United States, the station serves the St. George, Utah area. The station is currently owned by Canyon Media.

History
The station went on the air as KKHK on 1984-02-21. On 1985-07-01, the station changed its call sign to KCKK, on 1992-11-23 to KONY-FM, on 2002-02-04 to KEOT, on 2002-02-15 to KHUL, and on 2003-04-09 to the current KPLD.

On January 17, 2012, KPLD moved from 94.1 FM to 105.1 FM.

The station features an on-air lineup of morning duo Lukas and LaRae, McCall in mid-days, Cindy in afternoons, and Kaden at night.

In July 2018, KPLD rebranded as "Planet 105.1".

Previous logo

References

External links

PLD
Radio stations established in 1988
1988 establishments in Utah
Hot adult contemporary radio stations in the United States